Granville E. Jones (October 14, 1900 – March 7, 1959) was a funeral director and Democratic politician.

Early life
Jones was born in 1900 in Baltimore, Maryland and moved to Philadelphia.

Career
After moving to Philadelphia, Jones graduated from the H. E. Dolan's College of Mortuary Science, after which he worked as a funeral director. Jones was also president of the Quaker City Funeral Directors Association. 

Political career 

In 1948, Jones was elected to the first of six terms in the Pennsylvania House of Representatives. In 1953, he ran for City Treasurer of Philadelphia, but was unsuccessful.

Death
Jones died in 1959 while still serving with the Pennsylvania House. He was buried at Mount Lawn Cemetery in Delaware County.

References

Sources

1900 births
1959 deaths
Pennsylvania Democrats
20th-century American politicians
Politicians from Baltimore
Politicians from Philadelphia